1200 Imperatrix, provisional designation , is a carbonaceous Hygiean asteroid from the outer regions of the asteroid belt, approximately  in diameter. It was discovered by German astronomer Karl Reinmuth at the Heidelberg-Königstuhl State Observatory on 14 September 1931. The asteroid was named after the Latin word for empress.

Orbit and classification 

Imperatrix is a member of the Hygiea family, a very large asteroid family named after 10 Hygiea, the main belt's fourth-largest asteroid. Imperatrix orbits the Sun in the outer main-belt at a distance of 2.7–3.4 AU once every 5 years and 4 months (1,960 days). Its orbit has an eccentricity of 0.11 and an inclination of 5° with respect to the ecliptic.

Physical characteristics 

Imperatrix is an assumed C-type asteroid which is also the overall spectral type of the Hygiea family.

Rotation period 

In August 2000, a rotational lightcurve of Imperatrix was obtained from photometric observations at the River Oaks Observatory in Texas. Lightcurve analysis gave a rotation period of 13.34 hours with a brightness variation of 0.23 magnitude. In September 2011, photometric observations by French amateur astronomers Pierre Antonini and René Roy gave a refined period of 17.769 hours with an amplitude of 0.21 magnitude.

Diameter and albedo 

According to the surveys carried out by the Infrared Astronomical Satellite IRAS, the Japanese Akari satellite and the NEOWISE mission of NASA's Wide-field Infrared Survey Explorer, Imperatrix measures between 36.00 and 43.64 kilometers in diameter and its surface has an albedo between 0.04 and 0.0714.

The Collaborative Asteroid Lightcurve Link derives an albedo of 0.0545 and a diameter of 39.39 kilometers based on an absolute magnitude of 10.8.

Four stellar occultation events by 1200 Imperatrix have been observed, all in 2021.

Naming 

This minor planet was named "Imperatrix", which is Latin for empress. The naming was proposed by German ARI-astronomer Gustav Stracke, after whom 1019 Strackea was named. Any specific reference to an occurrence or person is unknown, according to the author of the Dictionary of Minor Planets, Lutz Schmadel and his communications with Ingrid van Houten-Groeneveld, who also worked at Heidelberg).

References

External links 
 Asteroid Lightcurve Database (LCDB), query form (info )
 Dictionary of Minor Planet Names, Google books
 Asteroids and comets rotation curves, CdR – Observatoire de Genève, Raoul Behrend
 Discovery Circumstances: Numbered Minor Planets (1)-(5000) – Minor Planet Center
 
 

001200
Discoveries by Karl Wilhelm Reinmuth
Named minor planets
19310914